Code Red were a British boy band, formed in 1996.

Career
Phillip Andrew Rodell, Neil James Watts, Sam Crouchman, and Roger Ratajczak formed themselves as the lineup for the vocal group, and they were signed by Polydor Records. They performed in the 1996 Great British Song Contest singing "I Gave You Everything", and finished as runners-up in the competition.

Their debut album Scarlet was released in 1997, and produced the hits "This Is Our Song", "Is There Someone Out There?" and a cover of the Tevin Campbell original, "Can We Talk".

Two years later, they released Missin You Already, a follow-up album which featured two hits, "What Would You Do If...?" and "What Good Is a Heart", which became a number-two hit in the MTV Asia Hitlist.

The group disbanded in 2001.

Discography
Studio albums
1997: Scarlet
1999: Missin You Already
2001: Crimson

Singles
1996: "I Gave You Everything" - UK #50
1996: "This Is Our Song" - UK #59
1997: "Can We Talk" - UK #29
1997: "Is There Someone Out There?" - UK #34
1998: "What Would You Do If...?" - UK #55

References

British contemporary R&B musical groups
British pop music groups
English boy bands
Musical groups established in 1996
Musical groups disestablished in 2001